KCEO (1000 AM) is a non-commercial educational radio station licensed to Vista, California. KCEO broadcasts with a power of 10,000 watts directional day, and 900 watts directional at night. The transmitter is located near State Route 76, north of the city of license of Vista and is east of Oceanside. Studios are located in Carlsbad, California. This station is an owned-and-operated station of Relevant Radio.

History

This station first went on the air on March 13, 1968, as KMLO. It was a 1,000-watt, daytime-only station owned by the North County Broadcasting Company. In 1976, the FCC granted a construction permit to increase the power to 5,000 watts day directional and 1,000 watts night directional.

Tri-Cities Broadcasting, owner of KKOS FM in Carlsbad, bought KMLO in 1985 and relaunched it as KKOS in January 1986. The call letters changed to KVSD "The Voice of San Diego" in April.
Prior to switching its programming to religious (Catholic), KCEO broadcast a business news format. From August 2005 to August 2007, KCEO had competition with Tecate, Baja California, based business talk station, Cash 1700. On August 1, 2007, Cash 1700 became San Diego 1700 and began airing a regular talk radio format, while still retaining Ray Lucia and a few small, one-hour business talk shows.

KCEO was one of the first stations to carry Rush Limbaugh. KCEO was the former flagship of Ray Lucia; he can now be heard on former competitor San Diego 1700. KCEO was San Diego's original business talk station 

Effective March 7, 2012, KCEO began airing Catholic programming full-time from Immaculate Heart Radio. The station switched to the Relevant Radio branding when the two organizations merged on June 30, 2017.

References

External links
FCC History Cards for KCEO
AM 1000 KCEO official website
SDRadio.net

CEO
Radio stations established in 1968
1968 establishments in California
Vista, California
Relevant Radio stations
CEO